Giorgio De Sabbata (2 July 1925 – 27 July 2013) was an Italian politician who served as Mayor of Pesaro (1959–1970), Deputy (1972–1976), and Senator (1976–1987).

References

1925 births
2013 deaths
Italian Communist Party politicians
Deputies of Legislature VI of Italy
Mayors of Pesaro
People from Pesaro
Senators of Legislature VII of Italy
Senators of Legislature VIII of Italy
Senators of Legislature IX of Italy